The following list features musicians who have worked with the band Boston.

Personnel

Current members 
Tom Scholz – lead and rhythm guitar, bass, keyboards, percussion, backing vocals (1976–present)
Gary Pihl – rhythm and lead guitar, keyboards, backing vocals (1985–present)
Curly Smith – drums, percussion, harmonica, backing vocals (1994–1997, 2012–present)
Jeff Neal – drums, percussion, backing vocals (2002–present)
Tommy DeCarlo – lead vocals, keyboards, percussion (2008–present)
Tracy Ferrie – bass guitar, backing vocals (2012–present)
Beth Cohen – keyboards, guitar and vocals (2002, 2012, 2015–present)

Former members 
Brad Delp – lead vocals, rhythm guitar, keyboards, percussion (1975–1989, 1994–2007; his death)
Jim Masdea – drums, percussion, keyboards (1975, 1983–1988)
Fran Sheehan – bass (1975–1983)
Sib Hashian – drums, percussion, backing vocals (1975–1983; died 2017)
Barry Goudreau – guitars, backing vocals (1975–1981)
David Sikes – vocals, bass, keyboards (1987–1999)
Doug Huffman – drums, percussion, keyboards, backing vocals (1987–1994)
Fran Cosmo – lead vocals, guitar (1993–2006)
 Anthony Cosmo (also known as Anton Cosmo) – guitar, backing vocals, songwriter (1997–2006)
Anthony Citrinite – drums (guest appearances, 2001–2002)
Tom Hambridge – drums (guest appearances, 2002)
Michael Sweet – lead vocals, rhythm guitar (2008–2011)
David Victor – guitar, vocals (2012–2014)
Kimberley Dahme – bass, guitar, vocals (2001–2012, 2014 guest appearances)

Member information

Tom Scholz 

Donald Thomas "Tom" Scholz (born March 10, 1947) is the primary songwriter, musician and founding member of Boston. He is also a notable inventor, businessman, and social activist. Much of the recording equipment used by Boston had either been built or modified by Scholz himself. Scholz is known for taking his time to perfect Boston's albums; Boston's last three studio albums have been released in 8-year intervals. Scholz has been the only member of Boston to remain for the entire run.

Gary Pihl 

Gary Pihl has been the guitarist for Boston since the departure of Barry Goudreau. He remained with the group for three albums: Third Stage, Walk On and Corporate America, and continues to tour with the band. He was also heavily involved in Scholz Research & Development and the development of the Rockman line of guitar amplifiers. Prior to Boston, he played with Sammy Hagar and with several other bands.

Tommy DeCarlo 

Tommy DeCarlo was a long time Boston fan who sang on stage at the Brad Delp Tribute concert. With a vocal style very reminiscent of Delp, DeCarlo then posted several Boston songs on his website (featuring his vocals). He has been the lead vocalist for the band since 2008.

Tracy Ferrie 

Tracy Ferrie has been touring with the band since 2012, playing bass and providing backing vocals.

Brad Delp 

Bradley E. "Brad" Delp (June 12, 1951, in Danvers, Massachusetts – March 9, 2007  in Atkinson, New Hampshire) was the lead vocalist of Boston from 1976 up until his death by suicide. He also contributed backup vocals, guitar, harmonica, and keyboards on several Boston albums. While on hiatus from the band, he played in a Beatles tribute band called Beatlejuice. He cited The Beatles as his greatest musical influence. He was also lead vocalist for the Return to Zero and Delp-Goudreau, along with former Boston member Barry Goudreau. Delp sings on all Boston albums except for Walk On.

Sib Hashian 

Sib Hashian (August 17, 1949, in Boston, Massachusetts – March 22, 2017, en route to Nassau, Bahamas) was the drummer for Boston on the group's first two studio albums and also provided drums for a few tracks on Third Stage. Hashian left the band in the early 1980s.

Fran Sheehan 

Fran Sheehan was brought in to play bass shortly after the band signed a recording contract in 1975. He left the group midway through the Third Stage sessions (he received a songwriting credit for "Cool the Engines").

Barry Goudreau 

Barry Goudreau (born November 29, 1951) was one of the original guitarists of Boston until he left in 1981. Since leaving, Goudreau has teamed up with several Boston members on various projects, including the band Orion the Hunter, Return to Zero, Delp-Goudreau, Ernie and the Automatics and various tours, appearances and EPs.

Jim Masdea 

Jim Masdea was the original drummer for Boston. He was replaced by Sib Hashian in 1976, just before the band released its debut album. However, he had been heavily involved in arranging the songs for the debut album, receiving an arranger credit, and did play drums on one song, "Rock and Roll Band."  He returned to the lineup for the Third Stage album and tour.  Masdea received the sole writing credit for the Third Stage instrumental song "A New World."

Fran Cosmo 

Fran Cosmo was featured as the sole lead vocalist on the platinum Boston album Walk On and one of the lead vocalists on the Corporate America. He also sang and played guitar on the tours associated with these albums. He was also the lead singer of Orion The Hunter, a group founded by former Boston lead guitarist Barry Goudreau.

Anthony Cosmo 

Anthony Cosmo is Fran Cosmo's son. He wrote and performed several songs on the album Corporate America and the follow-up tour. He and his father were later sued by Scholz for improper use of the Boston name after they departed in 2006. The suit was settled out of court.

Michael Sweet 

Michael Sweet was named new lead vocalist of Boston after performing at the Brad Delp Tribute in 2007. He left Boston in August 2011 to focus on his other band, Stryper.

Kimberley Dahme 

Kimberley Dahme is the first female member of the band. Kimberley's forte is actually country music which she writes and records in Nashville where she lives. Tom Scholz was looking for a drummer and a bassist and happened to hear her perform in New England and asked her if she could play bass. Her response was that she could learn. She began performing with Boston at the 2002 Fiesta Bowl and played on the Corporate America album and tour. She has also performed in a Boston cover band, and has several country solo albums.  In 2014, she toured with the band playing guitar and providing background vocals.

Jeff Neal 

Jeff Neal is a drummer who joined Boston in 2002. He participated in the recording of Corporate America and toured with the band in 2003, 2004, 2008 and 2014.

David Victor 
David Victor played guitar and shared lead vocals with Tommy DeCarlo, joining Boston for their 2012 summer tour.

Beth Cohen 

Beth Cohen lent background vocals on "You Gave Up on Love," which appeared on Boston's 2012 release, Life, Love & Hope, as well as on the earlier version which was released on Corporate America in 2002. She has been touring with the band since 2015, providing keyboards, vocals, and rhythm guitar.

Timeline

Lineups

References

External links 
 "Musicians" section on the Official Boston Site

 
Boston